The 1994 NCAA Division I Outdoor Track and Field Championships were contested June 1−4 at Bronco Stadium at Boise State University in Boise, Idaho. It determined the individual and team national champions of men's and women's collegiate Division I outdoor track and field events in the United States.

These were the 72nd annual men's championships and the 13th annual women's championships. This was the Broncos' first time hosting the event; it returned to Boise five years later.

In a repeat of the previous two years' results, Arkansas and LSU topped the men's and women's team standings, respectively; it was the Razorbacks' fourth men's team title and the eighth for the Lady Tigers. This was the third of eight consecutive titles for Arkansas. The Lady Tigers, meanwhile, captured their eighth consecutive title and, ultimately, the eighth of eleven straight titles they won between 1987 and 1997.

With a final day attendance of 10,493 on Saturday, the four-day total was 34,816.

Individual results

Team results 
 Note: Top 10 only
 (H) = Hosts
Full results

Men's standings

Women's standings

References

NCAA Men's Outdoor Track and Field Championship
NCAA Division I Outdoor Track and Field Championships
NCAA
Sports competitions in Idaho
NCAA Division I Outdoor Track and Field Championships
NCAA Women's Outdoor Track and Field Championship